A list of films produced in the Soviet Union in 1934 (see 1934 in film).

1934

See also
1934 in the Soviet Union

External links
 Soviet films of 1934 at the Internet Movie Database

1934
Soviet
Films